Lobostemon echioides, the common healthbush, is the mostly widely distributed species in its genus. It is endemic to South Africa, where it is found growing between Namaqualand and the Karoo and the Eastern Cape.

Description 
The stalkless leaves are narrow and hairy and are often soft and silvery.

Flowers are mainly present from August to October but have been found year round. Plants flowering from February to May seem to be confined to the southern parts of the distribution, where small amounts of rain are available throughout the year. They are hairy on the outside and are borne in may flowered cymes. The buds are arranged in two distinct rows, spreading greatly in the fruiting stage. The stamens protrude beyond the petals. The staminal scales are triangular with lateral lobes.

Distribution and habitat 
This is the most widely distributed Lobostemon species, occurring across the range of the genus. It grows from Namaqualand and the Karoo through to the Eastern Cape. It prefers drier habitats and is absent from wetter areas. It grows on stony slopes and flats in mostly sandstone derived soils.

Ecology 
As with other Lobostemon species, the common healthbush is able to resprout after a fire.

References 

Boraginaceae
Plants described in 1830